John Robert Veitch (26 August 1937 – 20 December 2009) was a New Zealand cricketer from Dunedin. A left-handed batsman, he played first-class cricket for Otago and Canterbury between 1957 and 1965.

Notes

External links
 
 

1937 births
2009 deaths
Cricketers from Dunedin
Otago cricketers
Canterbury cricketers
New Zealand cricketers
South Island cricketers